FFA Private Bank is a financial institution based in Dubai (DIFC), United Arab Emirates specializing in the fields of capital markets, wealth management and advisory services.

History and profile

FFA Private Bank (Dubai) Ltd, founded in 2006,  is regulated by the Dubai Financial Services Authority (DFSA) and operates from within the Dubai International Financial Center.
  and is fully owned by FFA Group Holding ltd, a Dubai based company registered in the DIFC.  

FFA Real Estate Ltd, fully owned by FFA Group Holding ltd, is actively involved in the development and management of real estate projects and properties across Europe, notably through FFA Real Estate GMBH, its German subsidiary.

See also
Dubai International Financial Center
Private Bank

References

External links
Official website

Companies based in Dubai
Emirati companies established in 1994
Financial services companies of the United Arab Emirates
Financial services companies established in 1994